Alison Baird is a Canadian writer and the author of The Hidden World, The Wolves of Woden, The Dragon's Egg, and White as the Waves.  She was honored by the Canadian Children's Book Centre, is a Silver Birch Award regional winner, and she was a finalist for the IODE Violet Downey Book Award.  She lives in Oakville, Ontario.

She received a B.A. (Honours) in English and an M.A. from Trinity College at the University of Toronto.

She also wrote the Willowmere Chronicles, a series of three books about a revenant (a person who has been reincarnated) named Clair Norton. The three books are The Witches of Willowmere, The Warding of Willowmere, and The Wyrd of Willowmere.
She is also the author of The Dragon Throne series. The three books in this series are The Stone of the Stars, The Empire of the Stars, and The Archon of the Stars.

References

External links
 Alison Baird
 

Writers from Ontario
Canadian children's writers
Living people
1963 births
Canadian women children's writers
People from Oakville, Ontario
Canadian fantasy writers
Women science fiction and fantasy writers